Halfway, Pleased (stylized as Halfway, pleased) is the third solo album by British pop musician Curt Smith, co-founder of Tears for Fears. It was released on 20 May 2008, and being Smith's first solo album following his returned on Tears for Fears.

Track listing
All songs written by Smith/Pettus, except where noted.

 "Perfect Day" – 4:21
 "Seven of Sundays" – 4:01 (Hawkes, Pettus)
 "Halfway Pleased" – 4:08
 "Greatest Divide" – 4:32
 "Coming Out" – 4:35
 "Aeroplane" – 5:37
 "Two" – 3:55
 "Addict" – 7:50
 "Cover Us" – 2:24
 "Who You Are" – 4:51
 "Where Do I Go?" – 4:56
 "Snow Hill (Live)" – 4:43
 "Seven of Sundays (Acoustic)" – 4:02 (Hawkes, Pettus)
 "Coming Out (Acoustic)" – 3:29
 "Seven of Sundays (Duet with SO)" – 3:52 (Smith, Hawkes, Pettus, Saillet)

Personnel
 Curt Smith – vocals, all instruments except as noted below
 Charlton Pettus – all instruments except as noted below, backing vocals on track 14
 Fred Eltringham – drums on tracks 1-11
 Doug Petty – keyboards on track 12
 Roland Orzabal - keyboards on track 12
 Wendy Page – backing vocals on track 13
 Sophie Saillet – vocal on track 15

Curt Smith albums
2008 albums